The Raffles Cup is a Thoroughbred horse race held annually in the first week of November at Kranji Racecourse in Singapore. Contested on turf over a left-handed course, the domestic Group One race is run over a distance 1800 metres (1.12 miles / 9 furlongs) and is open to horses age three and older.

The Raffles Cup was inaugurated in 1991 at the Bukit Timah Race Course and raced there through 1999 when the track was closed to be replaced by the new Kranji Racecourse. It was raced at 1600 metres from 1991 through 2000 then in 2001 it was changed to its present distance of 1800 metres.

Named for Sir Stamford Raffles, founder of Singapore, the Raffles Cup is the second leg of the Singapore Triple Crown. It comes after the Kranji Mile  and is  followed by the Singapore Gold Cup.

Records
Speed  record:
 1:48.0 - Chevron (2008)

Most wins by an owner:
 3 - Auric Stable (1993, 1994, 1995)

Most wins by a jockey:
 3 - Kim Clapperton (1993, 1994, 1995)

Most wins by a trainer:
 4 - Teh Choon Beng (1991, 1993, 1994, 1995)

Winners

References
 The Raffles Cup at the Singapore Turf Club

Graded stakes races in Singapore
Open mile category horse races
Recurring events established in 2000
Sport in Singapore